Kojirō, Kojiro, Koujirou or Kohjiroh is a masculine Japanese given name. Notable people with the name include:

 (born 1977), Japanese footballer
, Japanese educationist
, Japanese scholar of Islam
Sasaki Kojirō (Ganryu Kojiro, c. 1585–1612), Japanese swordsman famous for his rivalry with Miyamoto Musashi
, Japanese actor
, Japanese sport wrestler

Fictional characters
James (Pokémon) (Kojiro), a member of Team Rocket from the Pokémon anime
Kojiro Hyuga, a character from Captain Tsubasa anime
Kojiro Murdoch, a character in Gundam SEED and Gundam SEED Destiny anime
 Kojiro, a character in The Irresponsible Captain Tylor anime
 Kojiro, a character in Brave Fencer Musashi video game, a fictional personification of Sasaki Kojiro
 Kojiro Vance, identified as the master of the spaceship Kobayashi Maru in the movie Star Trek II: The Wrath of Khan
Kojiro Kanemaki, a main character from the manga/anime, Orient, by Shinobu Ohtaka.

See also
Sasaki Kojiro a 1967 Japanese drama film directed by Hiroshi Inagaki
Fūma no Kojirō, a Japanese manga and anime series and its title character
Kōjiro Station (Nagasaki), a train station in Unzen, Nagasaki Prefecture, Japan
Kōjiro Station (Yamaguchi), a train station in Iwakuni, Yamaguchi Prefecture, Japan

Japanese masculine given names